Hande Eslen-Ziya (born 1976) is a Turkish-born, Norway-based sociologist and psychologist. She is Professor of Sociology and Director of the Populism, Anti-Gender and Democracy Research Group at the University of Stavanger in Norway. She has an established interest in gender and social inequalities, transnational organizations and social activism, and has a substantial portfolio of research in this field. Her research has been published in Gender, Work and Organisation, Emotion, Space and Society, Social Movement Studies, European Journal of Women’s Studies, Culture, Health and Sexuality, Leadership, Men and Masculinities, and Social Politics, as well as in other internationally recognized journals. She is known for her work on the concept of "troll science," that she describes as an alternative discourse created by right-wing populist ideologies such as the anti-gender movement in opposition to established scholarly discourse.

Career
She earned a B.Sc. (1997) and an M.Sc. (1999) in psychology at Boğaziçi University, a PhD in sociology at the Polish Academy of Sciences (2008) and a habilitation by the Turkish Higher Education Council (2015). She was awarded Young Outstanding Researcher by the University of Stavanger (2020). 

She worked at the psychology and sociology departments (full time and part time) of several Turkish universities (Haliç University, Bahçeşehir University, Boğaziçi University, Yeditepe University and Okan University) and the University of KwaZulu-Natal in South Africa, before joining the University of Brighton. In 2018 she joined the University of Stavanger as an associate professor, and in 2020 she was promoted to professor of sociology. She is the Director of the Populism, Anti-Gender and Democracy Research Group.

In her research she focuses on gender and social inequality, transnational organizations and social movements and activism. She has researched the use of discursive tools by illiberal regimes, especially in Turkey. She is known for her work on how right-wing populist ideologies such as the anti-gender movement create an alternative "troll science" discourse that stands in opposition to recognized scholarship. From 2020, she heads the research project "Fighting pandemics with enhanced risk communication", funded by the Research Council of Norway.

Books
 "Populism and Science in Europe", Springer, Palgrave Macmillan (2022). https://link.springer.com/book/10.1007/978-3-030-97535-7 
 The Aesthetics of Global Protest: Visual Culture and Communication, Amsterdam University Press (2019)
 Politics and Gender Identity in Turkey: Centralised Islam for Socio-Economic Control, Routledge (2018)
 The Social Construction and Developmental Trajectories of Masculinities, Istanbul Bilgi Universitesi Yayınları (2017)

References

Living people
1975 births
Turkish psychologists
Turkish sociologists
Academic staff of the University of Stavanger